This is a partial list of Roman laws. A Roman law (Latin: lex) is usually named for the sponsoring legislator and designated by the adjectival form of his gens name (nomen gentilicum), in the feminine form because the noun lex (plural leges) is of feminine grammatical gender. When a law is the initiative of the two consuls, it is given the name of both, with the nomen of the senior consul first. Sometimes a law is further specified by a short phrase describing the content of the law, to distinguish that law from others sponsored by members of the same gens.

Roman laws

Post-Roman law codes based on Roman legislation 

lex Romana Burgundionum one of the law tables for Romans after the fall of the Western Roman Empire
lex Romana Visigothorum (AD 506) one of the law tables for Romans after the fall of the Western Roman Empire

General denominations 

lex agraria A law regulating distribution of public lands
lex annalis A law regarding qualifications for magistracies, such as age or experience
lex ambitus A law involving electoral bribery and corruption; see ambitus
lex curiata Any law passed by the comitia curiata. These included Roman adoptions, particularly so-called "testamentary adoptions" (famously in 59 BC when the patrician Clodius Pulcher was adopted into a plebeian gens in order to run for the office of tribune of the plebs) and the lex curiata de imperio which granted imperium to senior Roman magistrates under the Republic, likely also ratifying the choice of a new king during the monarchy. It was the traditional basis for the later lex de Imperio allowing imperial succession.
lex frumentaria A law regulating the price of grain
lex sumptuaria A law regulating the use of luxury items and public manifestations of wealth

Resolutions of the Senate 
Senatus consultum A Senate decree
Senatus consultum ultimum or Senatus consultum de re publica defenda  a late republic alternative to nominating a dictator
Senatus consultum de Bacchanalibus (186 BC) concerning the Bacchanalia
Senatus consultum Claudianum (AD 52) concerning slaves
Senatus consultum Macedonianum concerning loan/mutuum (time of Vespasian)
Senatus consultum Neronianum (c. AD 100) concerning legatum
Senatus consultum Orphitianum (c. AD 200) concerning inheritance
Senatus consultum Pegasianum (c. AD 100) concerning fideicommissum
Senatus consultum Silanianum (AD 10) concerning slaves
Senatus consultum Tertullianum concerning inheritance (time of Hadrian)
Senatus consultum Vellaeanum (AD 46) concerning intercedere

Other 
Constitution of the Roman Republic Set the separation of powers and checks and balances of the Roman Republic
Acceptilatio spoken statement of debt or obligation release
Constitutio Antoniniana granted citizenship to the Empire's freemen
Corpus Iuris Civilis codification by emperor Justinian
Stipulatio basic oral contract
Twelve Tables The first set of Roman laws published by the Decemviri in 451 BC, which would be the starting point of the elaborate Roman constitution. The twelve tables covered issues of civil, criminal and military law. Every Roman that went to school was supposed to know them by heart.

See also
 Constitution of the Roman Republic
 International Roman Law Moot Court
 Twelve Tables

References

Bibliography 

 Brennan, T. Corey, The Praetorship in the Roman Republic, Oxford University Press, 2000.
 François Hinard, Rome, la dernière république, Recueil d'articles de François Hinard, textes réunis et présentés par Estelle Bertrand, Ausonius, Pessac, 2011. 
 Ronald Syme, "Ten Tribunes", The Journal of Roman Studies, 1963, Vol. 53, Parts 1 and 2 (1963), pp. 55–60.
 Walbank, F. W., et al., The Cambridge Ancient History, vol. VII, part 2, The Rise of Rome to 220 BC, Cambridge University Press (1989).

External links
 
 

Laws
Roman laws